Chainsaw Man is a Japanese manga series written and illustrated by Tatsuki Fujimoto. The series' first part, ran in Shueisha's shōnen manga anthology Weekly Shōnen Jump from December 3, 2018, to December 14, 2020; following the series' conclusion in Weekly Shōnen Jump, a second part was announced to start on Shueisha's Shōnen Jump+ online magazine. On December 19, 2020, it was announced that the second part, would feature Denji going to school. The second part began serialization on July 13, 2022. Shueisha has collected its chapters into individual tankōbon volumes. The first volume was released on March 4, 2019. As of January 4, 2023, thirteen volumes have been released. 

In North America, Viz Media published the series' first two chapters on their Weekly Shonen Jump digital magazine for its "Jump Start" initiative. The series was then published on the Shonen Jump digital platform after the cancellation of Weekly Shonen Jump. Shueisha also simulpublished the series in English on the app and website Manga Plus starting in January 2019. In February 2020, Viz Media announced the digital and print release of the manga. The first volume was released on October 6, 2020. As of June 7, 2022, eleven volumes have been released.


Volume list

Chapters not yet in tankōbon format
These chapters have yet to be published in a tankōbon volume.

References

Chainsaw Man
Chainsaw Man